Charles Scofield may refer to:

 Charles A. Scofield (1853–1910), mayor of Norwalk, Connecticut
 Charles L. Scofield (born 1925), member of the North Dakota House of Representatives